P1Harmony (RR: Piwonhamoni; Japanese: ピーワンハーモニー; Acronym: P1H) is a South Korean boy band formed and managed by FNC Entertainment, consisting of Keeho, Theo, Jiung, Intak, Soul, and Jongseob. The group was introduced through premiered the future film P1H: The Beginning of a New World starring by all members on August 27, 2020. The group officially debuted on October 28, with their first EP Disharmony: Stand Out.

Name
The team name, P1Harmony, is a combination of Plus, Number 1, and Harmony. Members of the group are all 'plus' (added) together to create 'one' group for archiving infinite possibilities for 'harmonies'.

The official fan club name of P1Harmony is P1ece announced on April 20, 2021, meaning fans are indispensable pieces for P1Harmony.

History

Pre-debut 
Prior to their debut, Jongseob was a contestant on SBS reality program, K-pop Star 6: The Last Chance as a member of Boyfriend. He won the program in which he was signed with YG Entertainment. Two years later, he joined YG Survival show YG Treasure Box as a member of Group C. However, he was eliminated in Episode 9. After leaving YG Entertainment, he moved to FNC Entertainment and eventually debuted with the group.

In 2018, Intak appeared as a guest on the 10th episode of the JTBC variety show I've Fallen For You.

2020: Debut and Disharmony: Stand Out 
In August 2020, FNC Entertainment announced that it was gearing up to debut a new boy group. On the 27th, the company released the teaser poster of the group's debut movie P1H: The Beginning of a New World, which they described as a fusion project combining K-pop and K-movie.On September 1, 2020, FNC Entertainment officially announced the name of their new boy group P1Harmony, followed by a Logo Performance video. On September 8, 2020, the main teaser was officially unveiled on P1Harmony's official YouTube account. On October 2, the group released team biography Photos, and on October 8, the group's future movie P1H: The Beginning of a New World, starring the entire group, premiered. The film describes how teenagers scattered in different dimensions try to save the ruined earth and locate the star of hope.
On October 28, 2020, the group made their debut with their EP Disharmony: Stand Out and its lead single "Siren". All group members contributed to all the lyrics for the album.

We are pleased to announce that P1Harmony participated in DAZED's "MIX HARMONY", an art collaboration project, and created a digital single "틀 (Breakthrough) Full Ver." The song is based on P1Harmony's debut album Intro; (틀) Breakthrough and expands the meaning of the lyrics. A visual interpretation of the song has been developed in collaboration with professional artists in the fields of fashion, dance, and art, including designer Yoon Kyung-deok, 1MILLION dance studio choreographers Choreo Lee Yoojung with Isabelle, and art director May Kim.

2021: Disharmony: Break Out 
On April 20, 2021, the group made their first comeback with their second EP Disharmony: Break Out and its lead single "겁나니 (Scared)". There was a sixfold increase in sales during the first week of the album compared to the debut.

With this album, P1Harmony states to conveys a more positive message to the world. The title track 'Scared' incorporates both hip-hop and R&B styles. The song is intended to show the world the importance of eliminating the framework of inequality. 'Believe in yourself, don't be afraid, make your voice heard' is the theme behind the song. In addition, all members contributed lyrics to five of the songs (six in total), demonstrating the strength and ambition of the group as self-produced artists.

The group was nominated for Seoul Music Awards New Artist Award and MAMA Men's New Artist Award in 2021.

2022: Disharmony: Find Out, Gotta Get Back, Harmony: Zero In and Harmony: Set In 
On January 3, 2022, the group released their third EP Disharmony: Find Out and its lead single "Do It Like This". Its first week sales exceeded 86,000 copies, more than tripling those of its second mini album, demonstrating the team's ongoing growth.

The album also features a significant amount of overseas sound. A total of nine regions of the iTunes world ranked it among the top three on the POP album chart. All of the songs on this album have also charted on the iTunes KPOP chart in the United States. UK media The Sun and global streaming service TIDAL have covered this comeback.

On January 28, 2022, it was announced that the group will be embarking on their first-ever overseas tour 2022 P1Harmony LIVE TOUR [P1ustage H : PEACE]. Their first stop was on February 26 in Seoul and they visited eight cities in the United States starting March 11. The tour ended on May 18. On March 10, 2022, the group released new song "Do it Like This", the English version of its title track in EP Disharmony: Find Out.

On February 1, the group's EP came at number four of the Hanteo Chart's list of best-selling K-Pop albums for the month of January 2022 with 91,969 copies sold.

On May 26, 2022, the group released their digital single "Gotta Bet Back" in collaboration with American artist Pink Sweat$. The song was composed by Pink Sweat$ himself, while members Intak and Jongseob directly participated in the lyrics.

On July 20, 2022, the group released their fourth EP Harmony: Zero In. The album contains six songs including the title track "둠두둠 (Doom Du Doom)" and the album sold about 104,000 copies in the first week, which is the best first week sales record for the group.

On November 30, 2022, the group released their fifth EP Harmony: Set In and its lead single "Back Down". The group debuted their lead single performance on NBC's 'The Kelly Clarkson Show' on the 29th; "HARMONY : SET IN" sold 132,000 copies in its first week, setting a new career high.

2023 - present: [P1ustage H : P1ONEER] LIVE TOUR 
P1Harmony will kick off the 2023 P1Harmony LIVE TOUR [P1ustage H : P1ONEER] tour in January 2023. Starting January 14–15 in Seoul, the tour is expected to meet fans around the world with performances in 12 cities across the United States. All tickets are sold out within 30 minutes.

Prior to their concert in Huston on January 26, 2023. A live interview with P1Harmony was aired on CBS's 'Great Day Huston', one of the most popular morning talk shows in the area.

Artistry

DISHARMONY(부조화) Series 
The first three EPs released by P1Harmony is under the name DISHARMONY(). Jongseob describes that these albums involved the process of understanding unreasonable things in the world and crushing them.

In their debut album DISHARMONY: STAND OUT, P1Harmony showing the courage to be different from others and bravely saying 'no' to the world (STAND OUT) in the society surrounded by DISHARMONY. They continued the theme with their second EP DISHARMONY: BREAK OUT. According to a representative from FNC, P1Harmony recognized the DISHARMONY of world in their debut album, the second EP is attempting to break free of this world more actively (BREAK OUT). In the lead song 'Scared', the lyrics offer courage to those who have given up on the fight against inequality. DISHARMONY: FIND OUT is the final in the series devoted to the previously discussed 'DISHARMONY'. According to FNC, the theme presented in this album is that P1Harmony becomes the master of a reimagined world, looks forward to the infinite possibilities inherent in dreaming, and searches for the path that leads from dissonance to harmony. 'Do it like this', the title track, conveys the idea of P1Harmony not hesitating but going ahead boldly into the new era.

HARMONY(조화) Series 
After concluding the trilogy of DISHARMONY, P1Harmony starts a new chapter with the theme of HARMONY. The FNC Entertainment states that the group is trying to convey a message of respect for freedom and individuality through those album. Jongseob concluded those albums illustrate how members assist each other in moving towards HARMONY. The first chapter in HARMONY, ZERO IN shows how the members finally found the ‘+WORLD’ and, and started with nothing (ZERO) to construct a new world. According to P1Harmony's interview, the fifth EP, HARMONY: SET IN, represents the start of the journey. The album portrays trust and strong friendship among members with a range of values and steps towards true harmony. A powerful message of unity and advancement is conveyed in the album's title track, 'Back Down' -- No matter where you are or when you are, do not back down from fear.

Philanthropy 
Before debuting, P1Harmony volunteered to help Mongolian children and farmers on Jeju Island.

After their debut, they have been actively involved in the 'Watch and Donate V LIVE' event organized by LOVE FNC and Naver Happy Bean Donation. In this series of V LIVE, the goal is to raise awareness about the many groups and times in society that need to be addressed. P1Harmony's ENFPs, Keeho, Theo, and Intak, participated in their V LIVE to inform and emphasize the severity of the education gap, and how COVID-19 exacerbates the problem.

Members 

 Keeho — Leader / Vocalist
 Theo — Vocalist
 Jiung — Vocalist / Rapper / Dancer
 Intak — Rapper / Dancer
 Soul — Rapper / Dancer
 Jongseob — Rapper / Dancer

Discography

Extended plays

Singles

Videography

Music videos

Other videos

Filmography

Movie

Concert & Tours

Showcase

Live Tour

2022 P1Harmony Live Tour [P1ustage H : Peace] 

On March 20, the postponement of the show in Chicago was announced after several staff members tested positive for COVID-19. On March 21, it was reported that all of the members except Intak had tested positive for the virus. As a result, the rest of the tour's shows dating March 20–28 were rescheduled to May 8–18.

2023 P1Harmony Live Tour [P1ustage H : P1oneer]

Concert participations

Other concerts

Awards and nominations

References

External links
 Official website

K-pop music groups
South Korean boy bands
South Korean dance music groups
Musical groups from Seoul
Musical groups established in 2020
2020 establishments in South Korea
South Korean pop music groups